Northwest Harbor may refer to:
Northwest Harbor, Baltimore, Maryland
Northwest Harbor, New York, census-designated place on Long Island
Northwest Harbor Bay, New York, a bay on Long Island